Oliver Michael Slipper (born 10 March 1976) is an English cricketer. Slipper is a right-handed batsman who bowls right-arm fast-medium. He was born in Slough, Berkshire.

Slipper represented the Surrey Cricket Board in a single List A cricket match against Shropshire in the 2000 NatWest Trophy. In his only List A match, he scored 26 runs.

He currently plays club cricket for Weybridge Cricket Club in the Surrey Championship.

Slipper was joint-CEO of Perform Group plc, a digital sports media business, headquartered in the UK.

References

External links
Oliver Slipper at Cricinfo
Oliver Slipper at CricketArchive

1976 births
Living people
Sportspeople from Slough
English cricketers
Surrey Cricket Board cricketers